The long-tailed brown-toothed shrew (Episoriculus leucops) is a species of mammal in the family Soricidae. It is found in China, India, Myanmar, Nepal, and Vietnam.

References

 Insectivore Specialist Group 1996.  Soriculus leucops.   2006 IUCN Red List of Threatened Species.   Downloaded on 30 July 2007.

Red-toothed shrews
Mammals of Nepal
Taxonomy articles created by Polbot
Mammals described in 1855